in Hakata-ku, Fukuoka, Japan is a collection of three separate buildings operated by the Fukuoka Convention Center Foundation.

Fukuoka Kokusai Center

A Sumo Tournament is held here every November. Many Grand Sumo Tournaments are held here and all attract many visitors.

Marine Messe Fukuoka

One of its main uses is as an indoor sporting arena. The capacity of the arena is up to 15,000 people for sports events and up to 13,000 people for concerts. It hosted the official 1999 Asian Basketball Championship and some of the group games for the 2006 Volleyball World Championship.

Japanese musicians Misia, Koda Kumi, and Ayumi Hamasaki commonly play here for arena tours.

Fukuoka International Congress Center

Events

Past events
 1999 Asian Basketball Championship
 2001 World Aquatics Championships
 2003 Mariah Carey - Charmbracelet World Tour
 2006 International Political Science Association world congresses
 2011 Girls' Generation - The First Japan Arena Tour (Girls' Generation)
 2013 Girls' Generation - Girls & Peace: 2nd Japan Tour 
 2014 Girls' Generation Japan 3rd Tour 
 2015 Exo Planet 2 – The Exo'luxion
 2016 Exo Planet 3 – The Exo'rdium
 2016 iKON Japan Tour 2016-2017 
 2017 Exo Planet 4 – The EℓyXiOn
 2017 iKON Japan Dome Tour 2017 
 2017 BTS Live Trilogy Episode III: The Wings Tour
 2018 Blackpink Arena Tour 2018
 2018 Aqours 3rd LoveLive! Tour ～WONDERFUL STORIES～
 2019 Red Velvet 2nd Concert "Redmare"
 2019 Seventeen - Seventeen 2019 Japan Tour 'HARU'
 2019 Iz*One - IZ*ONE 1st Concert "Eyes On Me"
 2020 NCT 127 - NCT 127 1st Tour 'NEO CITY – The Origin'
 2020 Twice - Twice World Tour "Twicelights"
 2022 NCT Dream - NCT Dream Tour "The Dream Show 2: In A Dream"
 2022 Treasure – Treasure Japan Arena Tour 2022–2023 "Hello"

References

External links

Convention centers in Japan
Basketball venues in Japan
Buildings and structures in Fukuoka
Music venues in Japan
Indoor arenas in Japan
Sumo venues in Japan
Boxing venues in Japan
Volleyball venues in Japan
Tourist attractions in Fukuoka
Sports venues in Fukuoka Prefecture